Saint-Roch may refer to:

In Canada:
Saint-Roch, Quebec City, a neighbourhood of Quebec City
Saint-Roch-de-l'Achigan, Quebec, a municipality
Saint-Roch-de-Mékinac, Quebec, a municipality
Saint-Roch-de-Richelieu, Quebec, a municipality
Saint-Roch-des-Aulnaies, Quebec, a municipality
Saint-Roch-Ouest, Quebec, a municipality
Saint-Roch River, a stream of Quebec (stream named Shields Branch in Maine)
Little Saint Roch River, a stream of Quebec

In France:
Saint-Roch, Indre-et-Loire, a commune in the Indre-et-Loire department
Saint-Roch-sur-Égrenne, a commune in the Orne department in north-western France
Church of Saint-Roch, Paris, a late Baroque church in Paris
Saint-Roch (Somme) station, a railway station in Amiens, Somme department

In the United States
 St. Roch, New Orleans, a section of the city of New Orleans, Louisiana

See also
Roch (disambiguation)
Saint Roch